Milluacocha (possibly from Quechua millma, millwa wool, qucha lake, "wool lake") is a  mountain in the Cordillera Blanca range in the Andes of Peru. It is located in Yuracmarca District, Huaylas Province, Ancash. It lies between Santa Cruz in the southeast and Champara in the northwest. Pilanco is located east of it. Los Cedros Creek flows along its southern slopes.

References

Mountains of Peru
Mountains of Ancash Region
Glaciers of Peru